Motu Tevairoa  is a  island in the Bora Bora Islands Group, within the Society Islands of French Polynesia. It is the located between Haapiti Rahi, and Ahuna.

Geography
Motu Tevairoa is the second largest island in the Bora Bora group.

History

Administration
The island is part of Bora Bora Commune.

Demographics

Tevairoa, the main village of the island, is on the south corner.

Tourism
The Island hosts the Pearl Beach Resort.

Transportation

After arriving in Fa'a'ā International Airport, an Air Tahiti inter-island flight (50 minutes) will bring you to Bora Bora Airport.

You will need to board the airline's catamaran shuttle to Vaitape, where you can hire a boat to Toopua.
Conrad Hilton resort operates a helipad on the island.

References

External links